Ross Fortier (born c. 1937) is a retired American football, basketball and baseball coach.  He served as the head baseball coach at North Dakota State University (1962) before becoming the head football coach at Minnesota State University Moorhead.  During his 23 years as the head coach at MSU–Moorhead, he led the Dragons to nine conference championships and seven playoff appearances.  He was inducted to the North Dakota State University Hall of Fame in 1979.

Head coaching record

College football

References

Year of birth missing (living people)
1930s births
Living people
American men's basketball players
Minnesota State–Moorhead Dragons football coaches
Minnesota State–Moorhead Dragons men's basketball coaches
North Dakota State Bison baseball coaches
North Dakota State Bison baseball players
North Dakota State Bison football coaches
North Dakota State Bison football players
North Dakota State Bison men's basketball players
College men's tennis players in the United States
High school baseball coaches in the United States
High school basketball coaches in Minnesota
High school football coaches in Minnesota